San Bartolomé Quialana  is a town and municipality in Oaxaca in south-western Mexico. The municipality covers an area of 49.76 km². 
It is part of the Tlacolula District in the east of the Valles Centrales Region.

As of 2005, the municipality had a total population of 2485.

Women in the area wear traditional clothing.

Quialana is a Zapotec word that means "black rocks" or "blackened rocks." This is associated with the fact that there is a rocky hill in the area which is called Picacho or Yubda (in Zapotec, "Sun Rock).

Municipal President Victorino Gómez Martínez died on August 25, 2020 during the COVID-19 pandemic in Mexico.

References

Municipalities of Oaxaca